is a Japanese shōjo manga written and illustrated by Banri Hidaka.

Plot summary
Akiyoshi Kazuha is the responsible oldest daughter in a large family. She attends an all-girls high school with her best friend Senko and has a crush on her little brother's kindergarten teacher. During her high school festival, she is shocked when a handsome hairstylist, Sugimoto Maki, who's helping at the festival, makes it obvious that he's interested in her. Complicating matters are Senko's infatuation with Maki, which makes Kazuha feel guilty about her developing feelings. The story also deals with several other relationships in Kazuha and Maki's group of friends.

Characters

Main characters
Akiyoshi Kazuha
Eldest daughter (also eldest child) of the Akiyoshi family. She takes care of her five younger siblings while her parents are at work. She's a beautiful girl who's admired by many other girls.

Sugimoto Maki
A friend of Mizushima, who seems to be Kazuha's first crush. When they first meet, he says he loves her hair, and wishes to style her hair very much. Mizushima, Honjo Tohru and he are best friends, and the other two of the trio credit him as the most carefree of the group.

Supporting characters

Akiyoshi family
Akiyoshi Chizuru Eldest son (second child). He's at a rebellious age and does some strange things.

Akiyoshi Momoka Second daughter (third child). She usually makes fun of her big sister.

Akiyoshi Tonami Third daughter (fourth child). Kazuha loves her very much and always does as she wishes.

Akiyoshi Ichihisa Second son (fifth child). He often makes a fool of Kazuha.

Akiyoshi Rei Third son (sixth and last child). He attends Sakura kindergarten.

Nishimiya Female Senior High
The school which Kazuha attends.
Matsuoka Senko Kazuha's best friend.

Ishizuka Asako Kazuha and Senko's friend. She often takes their photos to sell for goods.

Sugimoto Saki Second elder brother of Maki. He is the teacher of Kazuha's class at Nishimiya. He is eager to do everything to ruin Maki's happiness. His name used to be Kawasumi Saki (his mother's surname).

Kita-hojo Senior High
Takasaki Asako's boyfriend. Like his girlfriend, he sells Arata's pictures for goods.

Inukai Miharu A former friend of Kazuha. She is now in the same school as Arata.

Sakura Kindergarten
Mizushima Tohru Kindergarten teacher. Kazuha's first crush. He is called the devil by Maki and Honjo (inside of the trio only).

Yamamoto Manami Mizushima's fiancee.

Sugimoto Yuuki's Salon
Sugimoto Yuuki The eldest brother of Maki.

Sugimoto Makako Yuuki's wife.

Fujisawa Eiji New member of the Salon. He is a super lazy man.

Fujisawa Eiko Eiji's little sister. She is a top student at a Beauty College.

Honjou Salon
Honjou Miyabi Arata and Toru's Mother. She seems to like academic, beautiful girls.

Honjou Tohru Arata's big brother and Maki's close friend. Because his given name is the same as his friend Mizushima(Tohru), the trio call them by their surname to distinguish the two.

Honjou Arata Honjou Toru's little brother. He has a crush on Kazuha. He attends Kita Senior High.

Katsura Minari She sometimes seems to be losing souls.

Moritaka Risa She seems to hate Maki very much. Because her former workpal Nishina quit, she seems to also hate Kazuha because of her friendship with Nishina.

Nishina Sachie Moritaka's former workpal.

Shiraishi Azumi She was Maki's first crush, but she had a deep crush on Maki's father, Kiichi. Formerly working at Sugimoto Salon, she then moved to work at Honjou Salon and live together with Maki at Grandma Sophie's house. She committed suicide.

Sugimoto Kiichi's Salon
Family of Maki, Yuuki, Saki.

Sugimoto Kiichi Father of Maki. He has a weakness for women.

Sugimoto Karen Mother of Maki. A photographer.

Sakuma Sophie Grandmother of Maki.

Kai

Fujisawa Shouichi Eldest brother of Fujisawa Eiji and Eiko.

Kamiya

Related manga
Prequel
365-nichi no Koibito
Owaranai Koi no tame ni
Ari no mama no Kimi de ite
Uta wo Kitasete

External links
 

CMX (comics) titles
Shōjo manga
Hakusensha manga